Events in the year 1859 in Venezuela.

Incumbents
President: Julian Castro until August 2, Pedro Gual Escandón until September 29, Manuel Felipe de Tovar

Events
January 20 - beginning of the Federal War between the Government of Venezuela and the federalists
September 2 - combat of Maiquetia
December 10 - Federal War: Battle of Santa Inés

Births

Deaths

 
1850s in Venezuela